Cerefolin is a prescription medication made by Pamlab that contains 5.635 mg of folate as L-methylfolate, 1 mg of vitamin B12 as methylcobalamin, 50 mg of vitamin B2 as riboflavin, and 5 mg of vitamin B6 as pyridoxine.  It is approved by the U.S. Food and Drug Administration for the treatment or prevention of vitamin deficiencies.

"Cerefolin NAC" contains L-methylfolate (as Metafolin) 5.6 mg, methylcobalamin 2 mg, N-acetylcysteine 600 mg.

Risks
Cerefolin is a potentially harmful drug. Adverse effects can include diarrhea, Hand-foot syndrome, Rashes, Renal stones, Constipation, headaches, flushing, and swelling.

References

Vitamins
Combination drugs